The Hoyts Group of companies in Australia and New Zealand includes Hoyts Cinemas and Val Morgan. Hoyts operates more than 450 cinema screens and 55,000 seats, making it Australia's second largest movie exhibitor after Event Hospitality & Entertainment. Val Morgan sells advertising on cinema screens and digital billboards.

In 2015, the majority of Hoyts was acquired by a Chinese conglomerate, the Wanda Group. In Argentina by Cinemark. In Chile it was acquired by Cinépolis, and in Uruguay by Life Cinemas.

History

1909 - 1930: At the start of the 20th century, dentist Arthur Russell bought a share in a small touring tent show incorporating magic and moving pictures. Russell also performed shows at St George's Hall in Bourke Street, Melbourne, and in 1909 moving pictures was the only attraction. Russell eventually negotiated a long lease for St George's Hall with the purpose of opening a Picture Palace called Hoyt's Pictures. By the time he died at the end of World War I, Hoyts had expanded into the suburbs of Melbourne and into Sydney. In 1926, Hoyts and two other companies, Electric Theatres Pty. Ltd. and Associated Theatres Pty. Ltd., merged to become Hoyts Theatres Limited. In 1930, the Fox Film Corp. (now 20th Century Studios) acquired a majority of shares in Hoyts Theatres Ltd.

1980s: In 1982, 20th Century Fox sold Hoyts to Stardawn Investments, a group of four Melbourne businessmen. In 1985, the Fink family subsequently bought out the other partners to become the sole owner. In 1987, the corporation was restructured and two of the companies in the corporation were listed on the Australian Securities Exchange: Hoyts Media and Hoyts Entertainment. However, the company that owned the cinemas, Hoyts Cinemas, was not floated until 1996. The years between 1987 and 1996 saw Hoyts expand in Australia, New Zealand and the United States.

1990s: Following Leon Fink's death in 1993, the Hoyts organisation was sold to Hellman & Friedman and Lendlease. The company eventually went public in 1995. In 1999, Hoyts celebrated its 90th anniversary and was ranked the seventh largest cinema exhibitor in the world. In the same year, the late Kerry Packer's private family company, Consolidated Press Holdings, bought the chain for $620 million. After that, Hoyts began to sell off international cinemas except for some New Zealand cinemas.

2000s: In 2004, Hoyts joined forces with Village Roadshow and Amalgamated Holdings Limited to bail out Val Morgan Cinema Advertising, eventually taking their stake to 100% in 2005. In December that year, Publishing & Broadcasting Limited and West Australian Newspapers purchased the company from Consolidated Press. In 2007, Hoyts was sold to Sydney-based private equity firm Pacific Equity Partners. The sale valued the company at A$440 million.

2010s: In 2010, Hoyts acquired Australian Multiplex Cinemas in Queensland and the Berkeley Cinema Group in New Zealand. Hoyts Stream, a video streaming service, was set to launch during 2013, but after being delayed, it was cancelled in 2014. Damian Keogh was appointed chief executive officer, and Hoyts was bought by Chinese billionaire Sun Xishuang through his investment company ID Leisure Ventures. In 2015, Wanda Cinema Line, a subsidiary of Dalian Wanda Group, purchased Hoyts from ID Leisure Ventures. In 2018, Hoyts Kiosk DVD vending machines were rebranded as Video Ezy after the group sold its subsidiary.

2020s: In December 2022, Hoyts acquired three cinemas in WA from Grand Cinemas after the company went into administration.

Cinemas

Features available at many Hoyts Cinemas include reclining chairs, large high-resolution screens under the Xtremescreen brand, and dine-in menus under the Hoyts Lux'' brand.
Seats that move and vibrate in synchronisation with on-screen action have been introduced at some cinemas using D-Box technology.

Hoyts Cinema Technology Group (CTG) was established in 2008 and helps other exhibitors such as Palace Cinemas install and operate digital cinema. Hoyts CTG also supports one-off screenings such as festivals or corporate events.

Val Morgan

Val Morgan was created by Valentine (Val) Morgan and specialises in advertising on cinema screens. Val Morgan's sister company, Val Morgan Outdoor (VMO), operates advertising screens in shopping centres, gyms, service stations and office towers, as well as outdoor digital billboards.

In 2019, a joint venture was formed to advertise on cinema screens in Saudi Arabia, as part of the group's expansion across the Middle East.

Hoyts Distribution 
Hoyts Distribution was the film distribution arm of the group which existed in its own right from 1978 to the early 1990s; it possessed the distribution rights to Cannon Films, Carolco and Nelson Entertainment films in Australia and New Zealand. It was later merged with the distribution operations of Columbia TriStar Film Distributors and 20th Century Fox, forming Hoyts-Fox-Columbia TriStar Films (later Fox-Columbia TriStar Films after Hoyts dropped out of the venture). In 2002, the company was revived, distributing primarily films produced by Nine Films and Television and major independent studios such as Lions Gate Entertainment.

Hoyts also operated a home video arm in concert with Sony, beginning in 1983 as RCA/Columbia/Hoyts Video Pty. Ltd. In addition to Columbia Pictures and TriStar fare through the main label, the company also held rights to Cannon and other releases via Hoyts, and starting in 1990, Orion Pictures releases via that company's worldwide distribution deal with Columbia. RCA/Columbia/Hoyts (later renamed to Columbia TriStar/Hoyts Home Video) also released product through two alternate labels, First Release Home Entertainment and Video Box Office. Hoyts also had for much of the 1980s a joint venture with PolyGram, Hoyts PolyGram Video.

In 2012, Hoyts Distribution was sold to StudioCanal, and took the StudioCanal name in Australia and New Zealand in March 2013.

References

External links

 Hoyts Cinemas Australia
 Hoyts Cinemas New Zealand
 Bloomberg

Australian companies established in 1909
Cinema chains in Australia
Cinema chains in New Zealand
Companies based in Sydney
Entertainment companies established in 1909
Dalian Wanda Group
Australian subsidiaries of foreign companies
2015 mergers and acquisitions